"Open Your Eyes" is the debut single from the Guano Apes released in 1997.

Chart performance
"Open Your Eyes" reached No. 5 in Germany, remaining in the Top 100 for 30 weeks. It won the "Local Heroes" competition held by VIVA, beating over 1000 competitors. Due to VIVA's heavy rotation of the music video, the Guano Apes signed a deal with Gun Records, which released their debut album Proud Like a God in 1997. Steve Huey's Allmusic review of Proud Like a God called the song one of the album's "strong moments". In 1999, the single was certified gold in Germany.

Music video
The music video features the Guano Apes playing the song in a hotel lobby, empty except for several bored staff, indifferent to and sometimes vacuuming around them.

Track listing

Charts

Weekly charts

Year-end charts

* American debut single, released in 2000.

References

1997 debut singles
Guano Apes songs